Frank Alexander McLain (January 29, 1852 – October 11, 1920) was a U.S. Representative from Mississippi.

Born near Gloster in Amite County, Mississippi, McLain attended the public schools, and was graduated from the University of Mississippi at Oxford in 1874.
He studied law.
He was admitted to the bar and commenced practice in Liberty, Mississippi, in 1880.
He served as member of the State house of representatives 1881-1883.
He served as district attorney for the judicial district from 1883 until January 1, 1896, when he resigned.
He resumed the practice of law in Gloster, Mississippi.
He served as member of the State constitutional convention in 1890.

McLain was elected as a Democrat to the Fifty-fifth Congress to fill the vacancy caused by the death of William F. Love.
He was reelected to the Fifty-sixth and to the four succeeding Congresses and served from December 12, 1898, to March 3, 1909.
State supreme court commissioner 1910-1912.
He died in Gloster on October 11, 1920.
He was interred in the City Cemetery.

References

1852 births
1920 deaths
People from Gloster, Mississippi
Democratic Party members of the Mississippi House of Representatives
Democratic Party members of the United States House of Representatives from Mississippi